Charlie Cooper (born 16 June 1989) is an English actor and writer, known for his role as Lee "Kurtan" Mucklowe in the BBC Three series This Country, which he co-created and co-wrote alongside his older sister, Daisy May Cooper.

Career
Cooper began his career in his early 20s as a model while at the University of Southampton studying physiotherapy. He was signed to Elite Model Management in London. He grew dissatisfied with modelling shortly afterward and returned home to Cirencester with his parents and worked a series of odd jobs, including positions at retailers Argos and Topshop and in a sausage factory.

In 2014, he and his sister Daisy May, with the support of ITV and NBC, wrote and shot a pilot episode of what would later become This Country titled Kerry. However, the resulting episode was "horrible" and it was quickly dropped. Later he became an actor and co-writer of the BBC comedy This Country with Daisy May, writing the characters Kerry and Kurtan based on their own life experiences living in the Cotswolds.

In 2018, he was nominated for and won three Royal Television Awards for best Scripted Comedy, Comedy Performance and Comedy Writing. He was also nominated for and won best Scripted Comedy at the 2018 BAFTA awards for his work in This Country, as well as winning Breakthrough Talent at the BAFTA Craft Awards. In 2020, he co-wrote and produced the teleplay for an episode of Avenue 5, an HBO series that features his sister in a recurring role.

He starred alongside Steve Coogan in a scene in the 2019 film Greed.

In 2021, Cooper took on a role in the third series of Stath Lets Flats, playing Gregory - a rival letting agent.

In September 2022, Cooper played his first "big film role" as Dennis Corrigan in See How They Run.

Personal life
Brought up in Cirencester, he and his sister used to make films using their mother's camcorder. After studying sports science at Exeter University for two years, Cooper dropped out to live with his sister in London, who was studying drama at RADA. They both returned to their childhood home, where they shared a room, and worked night shifts as office cleaners whilst creating scripts for This Country. He is a fan of Fulham F.C., having attended their play-off final in 2018. In August 2022, Cooper welcomed his first child.

References

External links 
 

1989 births
Living people
English television writers
English male television actors
English comedians
British male television writers
BAFTA winners (people)
English male models
Male actors from Gloucestershire
People from Cirencester
English male film actors
21st-century English male actors